Vietnam participated in the 2012 Asian Beach Games in Haiyang, China on 16–22 July 2012.

The Vietnamese team comprised 95 athletes competing in 9 sports: Beach handball, Beach sepaktakraw, Beach soccer, Beach volleyball, Woodball, Sport climbing, Roller Skating, Beach Basketball, Dragon Boat .

Competitors

Medal summary

Medals table

Medalists 

Nations at the 2012 Asian Beach Games
2012
Asian Beach Games